The New International Version (NIV) is a translation of the Bible in contemporary English. Published by Biblica, the complete NIV was released in 1978 with a minor revision in 1984 and a major revision in 2011. The NIV relies on recently published critical editions of the original Hebrew, Aramaic, and Greek texts.

Biblica claims that "the NIV delivers the very best combination of accuracy and readability." As of March 2013, over 450 million printed copies of the translation had been distributed. The NIV is the best-selling translation in the United States.

History

Beginnings
In 1955, businessman Howard Long was convinced of the need for a contemporary English translation of the Bible while sharing the gospel with a business associate. He was unhappy with the King James Version that he used to communicate the gospel and was frustrated with its archaic language. He thought, “Everywhere I go, in Canada, the U.S., anywhere, there are people who would like to read their Bible to their children at night. And they don’t have something the children can grasp.” He shared the frustration with his pastor Reverend Peter DeJong. Inspired by the great need for bible in contemporary English, the two men petitioned their denomination, Christian Reformed Church (CRC). After initial rejection and deferral, the CRC endorsed a committee to investigate the issue in 1957.

The NIV began with the formation of a small committee to study the value of producing a translation in the common language of the American people and a project of the National Association of Evangelicals in 1957. In 1964, a joint committee of representatives from the Christian Reformed Church and National Association of Evangelicals issued invitations to a translation conference and that conference met in August 1965 at Trinity Christian College in Palos Heights, Illinois. Two key decisions were made, the first was that “a contemporary English translation of the Bible should be undertaken as a collegiate endeavor of evangelical scholars.” The second was that a “continuing committee of fifteen” should be established to move the work forward. The “committee of fifteen” was ultimately named the Committee on Bible Translation (CBT) while the “Contemporary English Translation” became the NIV. 

In 1967, the New York Bible Society (now called Biblica) took responsibility for the project and hired a team of 15 scholars from various Evangelical Christian denominations and from various countries. The initial "Committee on Bible Translation" consisted of Leslie Carlson, Edmund Clowney, Ralph Earle, Jr., Burton L. Goddard, R. Laird Harris, Earl S. Kalland, Kenneth Kantzer, Robert H. Mounce, Charles F. Pfeiffer, Charles Caldwell Ryrie, Francis R. Steele, John H. Stek, J. C. Wenger, Stephen W. Paine, and Marten Woudstra. The New Testament was released in 1973 and the full Bible in 1978. A UK version was also released, to accommodate differences between American English and British English. 

The NIV underwent a minor revision in 1984.

Inclusive language editions 
In 1995 a new version of the New Testament and Psalms was published in the UK, with the full Bible following in 1996 as the New International Version Inclusive Language Edition, but was not published in the U.S. because of opposition from conservative evangelical groups there to gender-neutral language. A further edition with minor edits was published in 1999.

A revised English edition titled Today's New International Version (TNIV), again using gender-neutral language, was released as a New Testament in March 2002, the complete Bible being published in February 2005.

2011 update 
In 2011, an updated version of the NIV was released, with both the 1984 version and the TNIV being discontinued.

The update modified and dropped some of the gender-neutral language compared to TNIV. This includes going back to using "mankind" and "man" rather than "human beings" and "people", along with other changes. Keith Danby—president and chief executive officer of Biblica, speaking of the TNIV—said they had failed to convince people revisions were needed and underestimated readers' loyalty to the 1984 edition.

Derivative versions

Plain English version (NIrV) 
An 'easy-reader' version, New International Reader's Version (NIrV), was published in 1996; it was written at a third grade reading level.

Spanish version (NVI) 
In 1979, the decision was made to produce a version of the New Testament in Spanish with the title La Santa Biblia, Nueva Versión Internacional (often abbreviated NVI), though at this point this version was based only on the former English translation of the historic manuscripts. In 1990, the committee on Bible translation headed by Drs. René Padilla and Luciano Jaramillo conducted a translation of both testaments from the historic manuscripts directly into Spanish, bypassing English altogether and producing a complete Spanish NVI Bible in 1999.

Portuguese version (NVI) 
In 2001, the Nova Versão Internacional in Portuguese was published.

Textual basis 
The manuscript base for the Old Testament was the Biblia Hebraica Stuttgartensia Masoretic Hebrew Text. Other ancient texts consulted were the Dead Sea Scrolls, the Samaritan Pentateuch, the Aquila, Symmachus and Theodotion, the Latin Vulgate, the Syriac Peshitta, the Aramaic Targum, and for the Psalms the Juxta Hebraica of Jerome. The manuscript base for the New Testament was the Koine Greek language editions of the United Bible Societies and of Nestle-Aland. The deuterocanonical books are not included in the translation.

Translation methodology 
The core translation group consisted of fifteen Biblical scholars using Hebrew, Aramaic, and Greek texts whose goal was to produce a more modern English language text than the King James Version. The translation took ten years and involved a team of over 100 scholars from the United States, Canada, the United Kingdom, Australia, New Zealand, and South Africa. The range of those participating included many different denominations such as Anglicans, Assemblies of God, Baptist, Christian Reformed, Lutheran and Presbyterian.

The NIV is a balance between word-for-word and thought-for-thought or literal and phrase-by-phrase translations.

Recent archaeological and linguistic discoveries helped in understanding passages that have traditionally been difficult to translate. Familiar spellings of traditional translations were generally retained.

Reception 
According to the Association for Christian Retail (CBA), the New International Version has become the most popular selling English translation of the Bible in CBA bookstores, having sold more than 450 million copies worldwide.

There are numerous study Bibles available with extensive notes on the text and background information to make the Biblical stories more comprehensible. Among these are the NIV Spirit of the Reformation Study Bible, Concordia Study Bible, the Zondervan published NIV Study Bible, the Wesleyan revision, Reflecting God Study Bible, as well as the Life Application Study Bible.

In 2009, the New Testament scholar N. T. Wright wrote that the NIV obscured what Paul the Apostle was saying, making sure that Paul's words conformed to Protestant and Evangelical tradition. He claims, "if a church only, or mainly, relies on the NIV it will, quite simply, never understand what Paul was talking about," especially in Galatians and Romans. In support of this claim, Wright mentions specifically several verses of Romans 3, which he suggests do not convey how "righteousness" refers to the covenant faithfulness of God or reflect his own thinking about the pistis Christou debate. All editions of the NIV have given "God's Faithfulness" as the heading for Romans 3:1–8. Wright's specific objections concerning verses later in the chapter no longer apply to the 2011 revision of the NIV, which moreover offers "the faithfulness of Jesus Christ" as an alternative translation to "faith in Jesus Christ" in Romans 3:22.

Mark Given, a professor of religious studies at Missouri State University, criticized the NIV for "several inaccurate and misleading translations" as many sentences and clauses are paraphrased, rather than translated from Hebrew and Greek.

Church historian David Bercot, whose focus is early Christianity, likewise deemed the footnote a "fanciful interpretation" that "is in no way an alternate translation of the Greek text."

Others have also criticized the NIV. In Genesis 2:19 a translation such as the New Revised Standard Version uses "formed" in a plain past tense: "So out of the ground the LORD God  every animal". Some have questioned the NIV's choice of pluperfect: "Now the LORD God  out of the ground all the wild animals" to try to make it appear that the animals had already been created. Theologian John Sailhamer states "Not only is such a translation[...] hardly possible[...] but it misses the very point of the narrative, namely, that the animals were created in response to God's declaration that it was not good that the man should be alone."

Biblical scholar Bruce M. Metzger criticized the NIV 1984 edition for the addition of just into Jeremiah 7:22 so the verse becomes "For when I brought your forefathers/ancestors out of Egypt and spoke to them, I did not just give them commands about burnt offerings and sacrifices." Metzger also criticized the addition of your into Matthew 13:32, so it becomes "Though it [the mustard seed] is the smallest of all your seeds." The usage of your was removed in the 2011 revision.

2011 revision 
Professor of New Testament Studies Daniel B. Wallace praised the 2011 update, calling it "a well-thought out translation, with checks and balances through rigorous testing, overlapping committees to ensure consistency and accuracy, and a publisher willing to commit significant resources to make this Bible appealing to the Christian reader." The Southern Baptist Convention rejected the 2011 update because of gender-neutral language, although it had dropped some gender-neutral language of the 2005 revision. Southern Baptist publisher LifeWay declined the SBC's censor request to remove the NIV from their stores. While the Lutheran Church–Missouri Synod rejected its use, some in the Wisconsin Evangelical Lutheran Synod (WELS) believe many of the translations changes are right and defensible.

Professor of New Testament Studies Rodney J. Decker wrote in the Themelios Journal review of the NIV 2011:
By taking a mediating position between formal and functional equivalence (though tending, I think, closer to the formal end of the spectrum), the NIV has been able to produce a text that is clearer than many translations, especially those weighted more heavily with formal equivalence... If we are serious about making the word of God a vital tool in the lives of English-speaking Christians, then we must aim for a translation that communicates clearly in the language of the average English-speaking person. It is here that the NIV excels. It not only communicates the meaning of God's revelation accurately, but does so in English that is easily understood by a wide range of English speakers. It is as well-suited for expository preaching as it is for public reading and use in Bible classes and children's ministries.

See also 
 Modern English Bible translations

Notes

References

External links 

 Official webpage
The NIV: The Making of a Contemporary Translation, Barker, Kenneth L. (ed.), Biblica
 "Is Your Modern Translation Corrupt?" on www.equip.org, White, James R., Christian Research Institute

New International Version
1978 books
1978 in Christianity
Bible translations into English